This is a list of U.S. military equipment named after Native American peoples, places, weapons or material culture.

Background
The U.S. Army and "Indians" could fairly be described as traditional enemies of one another in the 19th century; among other things there was a long series of conflicts known as the Indian Wars. In the 20th and 21st centuries Indigenous peoples played a significant role in U.S. military operations; for example the code talkers of World Wars I and II, and Ira Hayes, one of the soldiers who raised the flag on Iwo Jima, was Akimel O'odham (Pima) born and raised in Gila River Indian Community.

The naming of U.S. military helicopters for Native peoples is the result of regulation AR 70-28: "Army aircraft were specifically categorized as requiring 'Indian terms and names of American Indian tribes and chiefs.' Names to choose from were provided by the Bureau of Indian Affairs." According to one military analyst arguing that U.S. military equipment names should be more evocative than an opaque series of names and numbers wrote, "The 1969 regulation codifying the tradition directed that name selection should appeal to the imagination, respect dignity, suggest aggressive spirit and confidence in the platform, and reflect its tactical characteristics. Such criteria should be applied more broadly."

List 

 AH-64 Apache attack helicopter
 BGM-109 Tomahawk cruise missile
 C-12 Huron transport aircraft
 CH-47 Chinook heavy-lift transport helicopter
 H-21 Shawnee transport helicopter
 H-34 Choctaw transport helicopter
 OH-58 Kiowa observation helicopter
 OH-6 Cayuse observation helicopter
 OV-1 Mohawk twin-engine observation aircraft
 RU-21 Ute electronic intelligence aircraft
 RU-8 Seminole utility aircraft
 T-41 Mescalero trainer aircraft
 TH-67 Creek trainer helicopter
 UH-60 Black Hawk utility helicopter
 UH-1 Iroquois utility helicopter
 UH-72 Lakota utility helicopter

References 

Military history of the United States
Native American topics